Nawal is a musician from Comoros whose music draws on traditional Comorian influences and incorporates sounds from African and Arabic culture.

Born into a musical family, she grew up with such sounds as dhikr (Sufi chanting) in mosques, twarab music, and popular music from the radio airwaves. She mixes Comorian rhythms with bantu polyphony, Indo-Arabian-Persian sounds and Sufi chanting into an acoustic roots-based fusion. She plays many instruments, including the guitar and qanbūs. She sings in Comorian, Arabic, French and English.

Discography
 2001: Kweli
 2007: Aman

References

External links
 Official site

Comorian Muslims
Comorian women singers
Comorian women guitarists
Living people
Year of birth missing (living people)
21st-century Comorian singers
21st-century guitarists
21st-century women singers
21st-century women guitarists